XHMAT-FM is a radio station on 99.5 FM in Mazatlán, Sinaloa, known as Vibra Radio.

History

XHMAT-FM received its concession on November 22, 1979. It was originally owned by Indalecio Mojica Uriostegui.

Match 

On December 26, 2019, Disney and ACIR announced they were mutually ending their relationship, which had covered twelve Mexican cities. Ten of the twelve Radio Disney stations, including XHMAT, were transitioned to ACIR's replacement pop format, Match.

Vibra Radio 

In June 2021, XHMAT-FM and its sister station in Culiacán, XHVQ-FM 96.9, withdrew from Grupo ACIR, changing to Vibra Radio on June 22, 2021.

References

Radio stations in Sinaloa